Closed is the sixth full-length album by punk rock band Bomb Factory.  It was released in December 2010 on Monstar Records, and contains 11 songs.

Track listing

References

External links
Bomb Factory's official website

Bomb Factory (band) albums
2010 albums